Malayalam numerals are the numeral system of the Malayalam script used by Malayalam in Kerala. It is one of several Indian numeral systems. This system is archaic and nowadays the Hindu–Arabic numeral system is used commonly. However it is still found in the Malayalam Bible denoting the chapters.

Base numbers
Below is a list of Malayalam numerals with their Hindu–Arabic equivalents as well as their respective Malayalam translations and transliterations.

Originally, a number like "11" would have been written as "൰൧" and not "൧൧" to match the Malayalam word for 11 and "10,00,000" as "൰൱൲" similar to the Tamil numeral system. Later on this system got reformed to be more similar to the Hindu–Arabic numerals so 10,00,000 in the reformed numerals it would be .

Old system 

Suppose the number is "2013". It is read in Malayalam as "രണ്ടായിരത്തി പതിമൂന്ന്" (raṇḍāyiratti padimūnnŭ). It is split into:

 രണ്ട് (raṇḍŭ) : 2 - ൨
 ആയിരം (āyiram) : 1000 - ൲
 പത്ത് (pattŭ) : 10 - ൰
 മൂന്ന് (mūnnŭ) : 3 - ൩

Combine them together to get the Malayalam number ൨൲൰൩.

Fractions
In Malayalam you can transcribe any fraction by affixing after the denominator followed by the numerator, so a fraction like  would be read as  'out of ten, seven' but fractions like   and  have distinct names and  'half quarter'.

References

Malayali people
Malayalam language
Numerals